Euphorbia ambarivatoensis is a species of plant in the family Euphorbiaceae. It is endemic to Madagascar.  Its natural habitat is rocky areas. It is threatened by habitat loss.

As most other succulent members of the genus Euphorbia, its trade is regulated under Appendix II of CITES.

References

Endemic flora of Madagascar
ambarivatoensis
ambarivatoensis
Vulnerable plants
Taxonomy articles created by Polbot